Ondata di calore (internationally released as Dead of Summer) is a 1970 Italian drama film directed by Nelo Risi. It is based on the novel Dead of Summer written by Dana Moseley. The film won the Golden Seashell at the San Sebastián International Film Festival.

Cast 
Jean Seberg as Joyce Grasse
Luigi Pistilli as Doctor Voltera
Lilia Nguyen as Maid
Franco Acampora as Bianchi

See also    
 List of Italian films of 1970

References

External links

1970 films
Films directed by Nelo Risi
Italian drama films
1970 drama films
1970s Italian-language films
1970s Italian films